Vasant Joglekar (1914–1993) was a film director and producer. He directed several Marathi and Hindi movies, including Aanchal and Aaj Aur Kal.

Selected filmography 
Aanchal (1960)
Aaj Aur Kal (1963)

References 

1914 births
1993 deaths
Marathi film directors